Arthur Rieusett Litteljohn (1 April 1881 – 8 December 1919) was an English first-class cricketer active 1905–14 who played for Middlesex and Marylebone Cricket Club (MCC). He was born in Hanwell; died in Marylebone.

References

1881 births
1919 deaths
English cricketers
Middlesex cricketers
Marylebone Cricket Club cricketers
P. F. Warner's XI cricketers